Cristina Antonescu (born 27 September 1986 in Bucharest, Romania) is a   Romanian aerobic gymnast. She won two gold medals world championship with the team, one silver world championships medals and five European championships medals (one gold, two silver and two bronze).

References

External links

1986 births
Living people
Gymnasts from Bucharest
Romanian aerobic gymnasts
Female aerobic gymnasts
Medalists at the Aerobic Gymnastics World Championships
Competitors at the 2009 World Games